This is a list of airlines currently based in Taiwan.

Scheduled airlines

Cargo airlines

See also
 List of airlines
 List of defunct airlines of Taiwan
 List of defunct airlines of Asia

Taiwan
Airlines
Taiwan

Airlines